The Tabatabai House is a historic house museum in Kashan, Iran. It was built around 1880, during the reign of the Qajar dynasty, for the affluent Tabātabāei family. It is one of the prominent historic houses of Kashan and Iran, together with the Āmeri House, the Borujerdi House, and others.

Architecture
The Tabātabāei House was designed by Ustad Ali Maryam, who later designed the nearby Borujerdi House, and it has been restored. It covers nearly 5,000 square meters and includes 40 rooms, four courtyards, four basements, three windcatchers, and gardens. It consists of the biruni ("exterior", the public area) and andaruni ("interior", the private quarters) features of Iran's traditional residential architecture, and is decorated with stone reliefs, stucco, and stained glass.

Gallery

See also
Iranian architecture

References

External links

 

Houses completed in the 19th century
Historic house museums in Iran
Buildings and structures in Kashan
Tourist attractions in Kashan
Persian gardens in Iran
Architecture in Iran